Margaret Eloise Knight (February 14, 1838 – October 12, 1914) was an American inventor, notably of a machine to produce flat-bottomed paper bags. She has been called "the most famous 19th-century woman inventor". She founded the Eastern Paper Bag Company in 1870, creating paper bags for groceries similar in form to the ones that would be used in later generations. Knight received dozens of patents in different fields, and became a symbol for women's empowerment.

Early life
Margaret E. Knight was born in York, Maine on February 14, 1838, to Hannah Teal and James Knight. As a little girl, “Mattie,” as her parents and friends nicknamed her, preferred to play with woodworking tools instead of dolls, stating that “the only things [she] wanted were a jack knife, a gimlet, and pieces of wood.” She was known as a child for her kites and sleds.

Knight and her brothers, Charlie and Jim, were raised by their widowed mother; Knight's father died when she was young, after which the impoverished family moved to Manchester, New Hampshire, where employment was available in the cotton mills. Any formal education she had was limited to secondary school, as she left to work in the mills at age 12 with her siblings.

12-year-old Knight witnessed an accident at the mill in which a worker was stabbed by a steel-tipped shuttle that shot out of a mechanical loom. Within weeks she invented a safety device for the loom, which was later adopted by other Manchester mills. The device was never patented and its exact nature is unknown, though it may have been either a device to stop the loom when the shuttle thread broke or a guard to physically block a flying shuttle.

Health problems precluded Knight from continuing to work at the cotton mill. In her teens and early 20s she held several jobs, including in home repair, daguerreotype photography, engraving, and furniture upholstery.

Career
Knight's first patent, issued in 1870, was for an "improvement in paper-feeding machines", a "pneumatic paper-feeder" with applications in printing presses and paper-folding machines; her paper bag machine would feature a three-step folding process in forming the flat bottom. At the time, many female inventors and writers concealed their gender by using only an initial instead of their given name, but Margaret E. Knight is clearly identified in this patent.

Flat-bottomed paper bag machine 
Knight moved to Springfield, Massachusetts in 1867 and was hired by the Columbia Paper Bag Company. She noticed that the envelope-shaped machine-made paper bags they produced were weak and narrow, and could not stand on their bases. They were also poorly suited to bulky items, such as groceries and hardware goods. Machines for producing these envelope-style bags were the subject of three patents issued to Francis Wolle in 1852, 1855, and 1858. Flat-bottomed paper bags, which were sturdier and more useful, were expensively made by hand.

Such flat-bottomed bags were already in general use in Britain since at least the 1840s, and improvements to hand-production techniques occurred during the 1850s. For example, a patent was awarded to James Baldwin of Birmingham in 1853 for semi-mechanized apparatus to use in the making of flat-bottomed paper bags. However, thinking to more fully automate the process, in 1868 Knight invented a machine that cut, folded, and glued paper to form the flat-bottomed brown paper bags familiar to shoppers today. This machine enabled the mass manufacture of flat-bottomed bags, much increasing the speed of production. 

Knight built a wooden prototype of the device, but needed a working iron model to apply for a patent. Charles Annan (or Anan), a machinist who visited the machine shop where Knight's iron model was being built, stole her design and patented it first. When Knight attempted to patent her work, she discovered Annan's patent and filed a patent interference lawsuit in the fall of 1870. Annan argued that "she could not possibly understand the mechanical complexities of the machine", possibly exploiting prejudice against women, and/or that his was a different machine (likely on the basis of details he had misremembered), and that she had not succeeded in creating a working machine. Some authors, such as Ryan Smith of the Smithsonian Magazine, state Annan argued no woman could have designed the machine, though according to Michael Abrams of the American Society of Mechanical Engineers, this is a modern exaggeration of Annan's sole argument that his was a different machine. Knight responded with copious evidence in the form of meticulous hand-drawn blueprints, journals, and models, and a number of witnesses who testified that she had been making drawings and models beginning in 1867. She spent the then-large sum of $100 per day in legal costs for the 16-day hearing, which resulted in victory. She received her patent in 1871.

For her invention of the paper bag machine, Knight was decorated by Queen Victoria of England in 1871.

With a Massachusetts business partner, Knight established the Eastern Paper Bag Company in Hartford, Connecticut. Having no interest in managing a business, she instead received royalties from the Eastern Paper Bag Company and continued to work as an inventor. She acquired a further patent in 1879 for improvements to the paper bag machine. It was also assigned to Eastern. Though Knight earned a comfortable income by her paper bag royalties, they were however capped at $25,000 and therefore ended after a time. She would continue in this pattern for the rest of her career, selling her various inventions to companies in order to live on royalties and patent sales.

Knight moved to Ashland and then Framingham, Massachusetts, working in an office in downtown Boston.

Later inventions 
In the 1880s Knight designed three domestic inventions. She patented a dress and skirt shield in 1883, a clasp for robes in 1884, and a cooking spit in 1885. In the 1880s and 1890s Knight worked on machines for manufacturing shoes, receiving six patents for several machines used in cutting shoe materials. In the early 1900s Knight developed a number of components for rotary engines and motors, with patents being granted in 1902 to 1915 (after her death). Her understanding of this work was unfortunately limited by her lack of education.

Her many other inventions include two patents of 1894: a numbering machine, and a window frame and sash. In total she was granted at least 27 and possibly 30 patents, though she also invented many devices she did not patent.

Later life 
Knight continued her work late into life. A 1913 article in The New York Times reported that she was "working twenty hours a day on her eighty-ninth invention."

Knight was never wealthy, though she lived more comfortably as an adult than in childhood. Knight never married and died alone on October 12, 1914, at the age of 76, leaving an estate worth only $275.05.

Legacy 

As a female inventor, Knight faced certain challenges and limits.  At the time Knight patented her paper bag machine, women held an extremely small fraction of patents. Today still, fewer than 10% of primary inventors are female.

An obituary described Knight as "woman Edison". Late in her life, Knight was recognized as a leader among women, her achievements held as an example by women's rights activists and suffragettes. She was profiled in several pro-suffrage newspapers and magazines alongside other women inventors as "lady Edisons". She was featured in a 1913 New York Times article, "Women Who Are Inventors," which rebutted the idea of female intellectual inferiority. The 1913 article was written in response to a certain physician's controversial opinion that women had their place in literature but were not inventive; he pointed to the few women recorded as eminent artists, composers, inventors, or even professions thought feminine, such as chefs and fashion designers. The article responded that women had been sequestered in domestic work and denied creative opportunities, and pointed to nine women inventors of the day, Knight foremost among them.

A plaque recognizing her as the "first woman awarded a U.S. patent" and holder of 87 U.S. patents hangs on the Curry Cottage at 287 Hollis St in Framingham. However, Knight was not actually the first: either Mary Kies or Hannah Slater holds that honor.

The flat-bottomed paper bag machine was Knight's most successful invention. Knight's bags differed somewhat from modern ones. They did not have accordion-folded sides like modern bags, which are therefore more compact in storage and have more defined corners; Luther Crowell patented an accordion-pleated bag in 1872. Another feature developed later was easy unfolding into a square-bottomed shape. Paper bags replaced cloth sacks, crates, and boxes for shopping, and were standard for nearly a century before being replaced by disposable plastic bags, for which a cheap manufacturing process was developed in the 1970s and 80s.

Knight was inducted into the National Inventors Hall of Fame in 2006. A scaled-down but fully functional patent model of her original bag-making machine is in the Smithsonian Museum in Washington, D.C.

Patents

Works about her
 Lynn Ng Quezon: Mattie and the Machine: A Novel. Santa Monica Press, 2022. 264pp. . (Young adult novel for ages 12+.)
Emily Arnold McCully: Marvelous Mattie: How Margaret E. Knight Became an Inventor. Farrar, Straus and Giroux, 2006. 32pp. . (Children's book which was recognized as one of the "best feminist books for young readers, 2007," awarded by the Amelia Bloomer Project of the Feminist Task Force of the American Library Association.)
DiMeo, Nate. no. 116,842 The Memory Palace Podcast Episode 78, November 5, 2015. (Podcast detailing Margaret Knight, her early life and inventions.)
 Marilyn Bailey Ogilvie: Women in science: antiquity through the nineteenth century: a biographical dictionary with annotated bibliography. 3rd ed. MIT Press, Cambridge, MA 1991, p. 110 f.
Sam Maggs: Wonder Women: 25 Innovators, Inventors, and Trailblazers who Changed History, published by Quirk Books on October 24, 2016, distributed by Penguin House. (A section detailing Knight's most notable inventions and her life.)

See also
Continental Paper Bag Co. v. Eastern Paper Bag Co.
Francis Wolle

References

General references 
 
Famous Women Innovators. (2008). Margaret Knight Invention of the Paper Bag Machine. Retrieved from Famous Women Innovators: http://www.women-inventors.com/Margaret-Knight.asp

External links
Margaret Knight, Invention of the Paper Bag Machine
Patents held by Margaret E. Knight

1838 births
1914 deaths
19th-century American inventors
People from York, Maine
Women inventors